List of Yiddish newspapers and periodicals

Newspapers

United States 

Di Tzeitung
Der Yid
Der Blatt

Periodicals

United States 
New York
Di Tsukunft (Die Zukunft) (s. 1892)
 Yugntruf
 Yiddish Moment

Others
 Oneg Shabbos
 Shpaktiv 
 Gigulim 
 Di Naye Gvardie
 Dos Yidishe Kol

Former newspapers

Belorussia 
Homel
 Der yidisher komunist (1919)
Hrodna
 Grodner Sztyme (c.1920-1939)
Minsk
 Oktyabr (1918-1941)
Vitebsk
 Der royter shtern (1920-1923)

Belgium 
 Unzer Wort (1941-1942)
 Unzer Kamf (1941-1942)

Canada 
 Di hamiltoner yidishe shtime (1933-1943) 
 Der Keneder Adler (1907-1977)

France 
Paris
 Unser Stimme
 Naye Prese (1934-1993)
 Unzer Wort ( -1996), the worldwide last daily Yiddish-language newspaper

Hungary 
Sziget
 Yidishe Folkstsaytung (1893-1913)

Lithuania 
Kaunas
 Arbeter Tsajtung 
Vilnius
 Folks-shtime
 Der proletarisher gedank (1906-1907)
 Der yidisher arbeyter
 Flugblat (1915-1916)
 Di royte fon (1920)

Poland 
 Arbeiterstimme (1897-1905, 1917-c.1939)
 Di royte fon (1906)
Łódź
Lodzsher Togblat (1908-1936)
 Lodzer veker
 Folks Sztyme (1939)
 Folks-Sztyme (1946-c.1950)
Warsaw
 Dos jidysze arbeterwort (1906-1907)
 Haynt (1906-1939)
 Folkstsaytung (1921-1939)
 Folks-Sztyme (c.1950-1991)
Włocławek
 Wloclawker Weker (c.1920-1939)

Romania 
Iasi
 Korot Haitim (1855- ), the first-ever Yiddish-language newspaper
 Der veker (1896)

Russia 
 Eynikayt (before 1945-?) (JAC)
Moscow
 Der Emes (1918-1939)
Saint Petersburg
 Jidishes Folksblat (1881-1889)
 Der Fraind (1903)
 Di Tsayt (1913-1914)
 Dos vort (1914)
 Di varhayt (1918),

Ukraine 
Kharkov
 Der Shtern (1925-1941)
Kiev
 Folks-shtime
 Naye tsayt (1917-1919)
 Komunistishe fon (1919-1924)
Odessa
 Unzer Lebn (before 1908- )

United Kingdom 
Liverpool
 Dos Fraye Vort (1898)
London
 Arbeter Fraynd (1885-1914)
Der Poylisher Yidl (1884)
 Die Zeit (Jewish Times) (1910-1951)
Teglicher Ekspress (1905, mocking the Daily Express)

Argentina 
Buenos Aires
 Der royter shtern (1923-1934)
 Unser Gedank

Mexico 
 Idish Lebn
 Radikaler Arbeter Tzenter
 Unzer Lebn

United States 
New York
 Freie Arbeiter Stimme (1890-1977)
 Dos Abend Blatt (1894-1902)
 Di Arbeter Tsaytung (1894-1902)
 Yidisher Tagblat (before 1903-1928),
 Morgn Zshurnal (1901-1971)
 Di Varhayt (1905-1919)
 Der Tog (1914-1971)
 Di Tsayt (1920-22)
 Morgen Freiheit (1922-1988)
 Der Algemeiner Journal (1972-2008)

Former journals

France 
Paris
 Der yidisher arbeyter (1911-1914)

Lithuania 
Vilnius
 Der arbeyter (1902-1905)
 Forverts (1906-1907)

Netherlands 
Amsterdam
 Die Kuranten (1686-1688)

Poland 
 Arbeiter Fragen
Warsaw
 Der arbeyter (1905)

Romania 
Iasi
 Likht (1913-1914)

United Kingdom 
London
 Der arbeyter (1898-1901)
 Germinal (1900-1903, 1905-1908)
 Di proletarishe velt (1902-)

Ukraine 
Odessa
 Kol Mevasser (1862-1872)

Israel 
 Lebns Fragn (1951-2014)
 Israel Shtime (1956-1997)
 Die Woch (1959-)
 Dos Yiddishe Licht, replaced with Beleichtungen

Canada 
 Keneder Adler (1907-1977)

Czechoslovakia
 Munkatsher Humorist

Literary journals

United Kingdom 
Oxford
 Yidish Pen (s.1994)

Poland 
Warsaw
 Forojs

Romania 
Bucharest
 Die wokh (c.1935)
 Shoybn (c.1935)

Russia 
Moscow
 Heymland (before 1948-c.1961)
 Sovetish Heymland (c.1961-before 1993)
 Di yidishe gas (s. 1993)

Israel 
 Naye vegn (after 1991)
Tel Aviv
 Di goldene keyt (1948-?)
 ToplPunkt

Argentina 
Buenos Aires
 Dorem Amerike (1926-1927)
 Naivelt (1927-1930)

United States 
New York
 Yidishe Kultur (1938-2006)
 Oyfn Shvel (Afn Shvel) (1957-)

Sweden 
 Yidishland (2019-)

Webs 
 Archive of Jewish Periodicals (German)
 Alphabetic list of Yiddish newspapers at the National Library of Russia

See also 
 List of Jewish newspapers

Notes 

 
Yiddish periodicals